The siege of Azekah was a battle between the Neo-Assyrian Empire and the Kingdom of Judah. It preceded the Siege of Lachish, making it the first known clash between the two kingdoms during Sennacherib's campaign in Judah. The most important source for the battle is the Azekah Inscription. The battle is not mentioned in the Hebrew Bible.

Background
Several kingdoms in the Levant ceased to pay taxes to the Assyrian King, Sennacherib; as a result, he set out on a campaign to once again subjugate the rebelling kingdoms, among them the Jewish Kingdom of Judah led by King Hezekiah.
After defeating the rebels of Ekron in Philistia he set out to subjugate Judah and in his way to Jerusalem he came across Azekah, among the most important Jewish cities.

Battlefield

Azekah was a walled settlement situated on a hill, typical of important Jewish cities at the time.

Order of battle

The Assyrian army

The Assyrian Army was the most formidable fighting force of its time and was divided mostly into three different categories:
Infantry, which included both close-combat troops using spears, and archers. There were also hired mercenaries throwing stones. The infantry was highly trained and worked alongside military engineers in order to breach sieges.
Cavalry; the Assyrian cavalry was among the finest in the ancient Middle East and included both close-combat cavalry with spears and mounted archers which could both use the agility of the horses alongside long-range attacks.
Chariots, which were better equipped for open land-engagements than sieges.

The Jewish army

The Jewish military force was dwarfed compared to the large, professional Assyrian army. Jewish forces mostly included local militias and mercenaries. There were barely any cavalrymen and chariots in the Jewish army, which mostly included infantry, either for close combat (spearmen) or long range combat (archers); they were also significantly less organized than the Assyrians.

The battle
The battle is depicted in the Azekah Inscription, in which Sennacherib mentions some details about the battle. He mentions that he used battering rams to bring down the walls which was followed by close quarters combat between the opposing sides' infantry. Afterwards, Sennacherib ordered his cavalry to charge into the city, leading many of the defenders to rout.

Sennacherib then looted and razed the city.

Aftermath
After the destruction and looting of Azekah, Sennacherib led his army further into Judah, which he once again commanded during the Siege of Lachish.

Ancient sources
Azekah Inscription

References

Azekah
Azekah
8th-century BC in Assyria
Sennacherib
8th century BC in the Kingdom of Judah